Willem Jacob Luyten (1899–1994) was a Dutch-American astronomer.

Luyten may also refer to:
 Luyten (surname), with a list of other people with the surname Luyten
 1964 Luyten, an asteroid named after Willem Jacob Luyten
 Luyten's Star, a red dwarf in the constellation Canis Minor
 Luyten b (more commonly known as GJ 273b), a confirmed exoplanet orbiting Luyten's Star
 Luyten 726-8 (also known as Gliese 65), a binary star system that is one of Earth's nearest neighbors
 Luyten 789-6 (also known as EZ Aquarii), a triple star system in the constellation Aquarius
 Luyten 1159-16 (also known as L 1159-16), a red dwarf in the northern constellation of Aries
 Luyten Five-Tenths catalogue, a star catalogue created by Willem Jacob Luyten

See also
 Lutyens (disambiguation)
 Lutjens (disambiguation)
 Luyt, surname